Rachael Elizabeth Flatt (born July 21, 1992) is an American former competitive figure skater. She is the 2008 World Junior champion, a winner of four silver medals on the Grand Prix series, and the 2010 U.S. national champion.

She was nominated to represent the United States at the 2010 Winter Olympics and placed 7th. She is a 2015 graduate of Stanford University.

Personal life 
Flatt was born on July 21, 1992, in Del Mar, California. She is an only child. Her father is a biochemical engineer and her mother a molecular biologist. Her grandfather competed on the national level in fencing.

Flatt is a 2010 graduate of Cheyenne Mountain High School in Colorado Springs, Colorado. In spring 2015, she received a bachelor's degree from Stanford University, where she majored in biology with a minor in psychology. She was the junior class president and a member of the Alpha Phi sorority. In her senior year, she became a research assistant in the laboratory of Professor C. Barr Taylor. As of September 2018, she is focusing on eating disorders as a Ph.D. student under Dr. Cynthia Bulik at the University of North Carolina.

In June 2019, Flatt got engaged to travel writer Eric Iwashita.   The pair married on August 1st 2020 in Colorado Springs.

Career 
Flatt began skating at age four. In addition to her singles career, Flatt also competed as a pair skater from 2001 to 2004 with partner Andrew Speroff. The pair won the silver medal at Nationals on the juvenile level in 2003 and the intermediate title in 2004.

Competing in ladies' singles, Flatt won the US Novice national title in 2005 at age 12. While, under other circumstances, this would have earned her an event on the Junior Grand Prix for the following season, Flatt was three weeks too young to compete internationally as a junior. She was invited to compete at the 2005 Triglav Trophy event in Slovenia, where she won the Novice competition. Later in 2005, Flatt was invited to compete at the 2005 North American Challenge competition as a junior lady, where she won the bronze medal. Flatt won the silver medal at US Nationals at the junior level in 2006.

2006–2007 season
Flatt missed the 2006–2007 ISU Junior Grand Prix season due to injury, but qualified through the regional and sectional qualifying competitions, winning both, and made her senior debut at the 2007 U.S. Championships, where she placed 5th and earned a bye to the 2008 U.S. Championships. Flatt made her international debut as a junior in March 2007 at the International Challenge Cup, which she won. Flatt was often referred to as "Rachael the Rock" and was often called  " The Consistency Queen" because of her ability to compete cleanly, landing up to seven triples in a freeskate, including her triple-triple combinations.

2007–2008 season
Flatt competed on the Junior Grand Prix for the first time in the 2007–2008 season, winning the gold medal at her first JGP in Vienna, Austria, and a silver medal at her second JGP in Chemnitz, Germany. She qualified for the Junior Grand Prix Final, placing third in the short program, first in the free skate, and winning the silver medal. At the 2008 U.S. Championships in St Paul, Minnesota, she won the silver medal on the senior level after winning the free skate.

Too young to be eligible for the senior World Championships, Flatt was placed on the team to the 2008 World Junior Championships. After placing third in the short program, she won the free skate and won the title overall. The American ladies – Flatt, Zhang and Nagasu – swept the podium.

2008–2009 season
Flatt began her season at the 2008 Skate America, where she placed fourth overall. She also competed at 2008 Cup of Russia, winning the silver medal behind Carolina Kostner of Italy. Flatt won the silver medal at the 2009 U.S. Championships. She placed 5th at the  2009 World Championships after Mao Asada.

2009–2010 season
Flatt won silver at the 2009 Skate America and finished 4th at 2009 Cup of China. She placed ahead of later Olympic champion Yuna Kim in the long program at Skate America. She won gold at the 2010 U.S. Championships and was named in the U.S. Olympic team. At the 2010 Winter Olympics in Vancouver, Flatt placed 7th with 182.49 points. She finished ninth at the 2010 World Championships.

2010–2011 season
Flatt won a silver medal at the 2011 U.S. Championships. She was sent to the 2011 World Championships. A week before the event, Flatt was diagnosed with a stress fracture in her right tibia (her landing leg). Nevertheless, her coach Tom Zakrajsek stated that he felt that Flatt could complete her elements despite the stress fracture and did not request that the alternate, Mirai Nagasu, compete in her place. During the competition, Flatt had errors on one of her jumps in the short program and three in the free skate and finished in 12th place. In May 2011, Flatt confirmed that she was leaving Colorado Springs in order to study chemical engineering at Stanford University and would look for a new coach in the Bay Area. In June 2011, U.S. Figure Skating reprimanded and fined Flatt for not informing them of her injury in advance.

2011–2012 season 
On August 19, 2011, Flatt announced that she would be working with Justin Dillon and Lynn Smith in Oakland, California. She also spent some time training with Sergei Ponomarenko in San Jose and Charlie Tickner in Redwood City. Flatt was 10th at 2011 Skate Canada International. Before leaving for Rostelecom Cup, she sprained ligaments around her ankle joint and finished 9th at the event. Flatt said she would spend her holiday break in Colorado Springs working with Tom Zakrajsek and Becky Calvin. She competed at the 2012 U.S. Championships and placed sixth.

2012–2013 season
Flatt finished ninth at the 2012 Skate America. On October 30, 2012, Flatt said she would miss the rest of the season due to the recurrence of an injury in her right lower leg and ankle.

2013–2014 season
Flatt completed the first step in qualifying for nationals by winning the 2014 Central Pacific Regionals. She placed first in both the short and the long with an overall score of 139.48. This was her first step in attempting to make her second Olympic team. In January 2014, she placed 18th at the U.S. Championships and announced her retirement from competitive skating.

Endorsements and public life 
Flatt signed an endorsement deal with AT&T, the Colorado Potato Administrative Committee (CPAC), and has also served as a spokesperson for Reading Is Fundamental, as well as the US Anti-Doping Agency. In the lead-up to the 2010 Olympics, she was endorsed by MAC Cosmetics.

In 2016, she was inducted into the Colorado Springs Sports Hall Of Fame.

Programs

Competitive highlights 
GP: Grand Prix; JGP: Junior Grand Prix

Ladies' singles

Pair skating with Speroff

Detailed results 

 QR = Qualifying round
 Personal bests under ISU highlighted  in bold

References

External links 

 
 
 
 
 

1992 births
Living people
People from Del Mar, California
American female single skaters
Figure skaters at the 2010 Winter Olympics
Olympic figure skaters of the United States
World Junior Figure Skating Championships medalists
People from Stanford, California
21st-century American women